Kyler Spencer Bush (born November 12, 1999) is an American professional baseball pitcher in the Los Angeles Angels organization. He was selected in the second round of the 2021 Major League Baseball draft by the Angels.

Amateur career
Bush grew up in Ogden, Utah and attended Fremont High School. As a senior, he went 5-2 with 2.51 ERA and 57 strikeouts over 39 innings pitched and was named first team All-State. Bush was selected in the 40th round of the 2018 Major League Baseball draft by the Kansas City Royals, but opted not to sign with the team.

Bush began his collegiate career at Washington State, where he pitched in 19 games as a freshman and finished the season with 0-5 record with a 12.69 ERA. He transferred to Central Arizona College before his sophomore year and went 5-1 with a 2.43 ERA over seven starts before the season was cut short by the Covid-19 Pandemic. Bush transferred to Saint Mary's College and was named first team All-West Coast Conference as a junior after posting a 7-5 record with a 2.99 ERA in 14 starts.

Professional career
Bush was selected in the second round with the 45th overall pick in the 2021 Major League Baseball draft by the Los Angeles Angels. He signed with the team and received a $1.75 million signing bonus. Bush was assigned to the High-A Tri-City Dust Devils to start his professional career, where he made five starts and posted a 4.50 ERA and struck out 20 batters over 12 innings pitched.

References

External links

Saint Mary's Gaels bio

1999 births
Living people
Baseball players from Utah
Baseball pitchers
Saint Mary's Gaels baseball players
Washington State Cougars baseball players
Tri-City Dust Devils players
People from Ogden, Utah
Central Arizona Vaqueros baseball players
Rocket City Trash Pandas players